Lanthanum manganite is an inorganic compound with the formula LaMnO3, often abbreviated as LMO. Lanthanum manganite is formed in the perovskite structure, consisting of oxygen octahedra with a central Mn atom. The cubic perovskite structure is distorted into an orthorhombic structure by a strong Jahn–Teller distortion of the oxygen octahedra.

LaMnO3 often has lanthanum vacancies as evidenced by neutron scattering. For this reason, this material is usually referred as LaMnO3+ẟ. These vacancies generate a structure with a rhombohedral unit cell in this perovskite. A temperatures below 140 K, this LaMnO3+ẟ semiconductor exhibit a ferromagnetic order.

Synthesis
Lanthanum manganite can be prepared via solid-state reactions at high temperatures, using their oxides or carbonates. An alternative method is to use lanthanum nitrate and manganese nitrate as raw materials. The reaction occurs at high temperature after the solvents are vaporized.

Lanthanum manganite alloys
Lanthanum manganite is an electrical insulator and an A-type antiferromagnet. It is the parent compound of several important alloys, often termed rare-earth manganites or colossal magnetoresistance oxides. These families include lanthanum strontium manganite, lanthanum calcium manganite and others.

In lanthanum manganite, both the La and the Mn are in the +3 oxidation state. Substitution of some of the La atoms by divalent atoms such as Sr or Ca induces a similar amount of tetravalent Mn4+ ions. Such substitution, or doping can induce various electronic effects, which form the basis of a rich and complex electron correlation phenomena that yield diverse electronic phase diagrams in these alloys.

See also
 Super exchange
 Double exchange
 Jahn–Teller effect
 Electron correlation

References

Lanthanum compounds
Manganates
Perovskites